Joseph or Joe Morgan may refer to:

Sports
Joe Morgan (American football) (born 1988), American football wide receiver
Joe Morgan (badminton) (born 1979), Welsh badminton player
Joe Morgan (1943–2020), American baseball player and commentator, member of Baseball Hall of Fame
Joe Morgan (manager) (born 1930), American baseball player and manager
Joe Morgan (rugby union) (1945–2002), New Zealand rugby union player

Others
Joseph Morgan (historian) (fl. 1739), British historical compiler
Joseph Morgan (politician) (1898–1962), Ulster Unionist politician representing Belfast Cromac, 1953–1962
Joe "Pegleg" Morgan (1929–1993), Mexican Mafia godfather
Joe Morgan (musician) (fl. 1996–2006), former bass player for InMe
Joseph Morgan (actor) (born 1981), English television actor
Joe Morgan, a character in 1942 film A-Haunting We Will Go
Joseph H. Morgan (1884–1967), Justice of the Arizona Supreme Court

See also
Jo Morgan, fictional character in British police drama The Bill
Joseph Morgan House, a National Register of Historic Places listing in Mercer County, Kentucky, U.S.